Dapoli is a town in Ratnagiri district, Maharashtra which is also a coastal hill station. Many high-ranking British officers' graves are found in this town. There is also an abandoned church from the time of the British Raj. Dapoli is administered by a Municipal Council.

Geography
Dapoli is separated from the Sahyadri range and is bordered by the Khed taluk in the east, and is also bordered by Mandangad taluk in the north, Guhagar taluk to the south, and Chiplun taluk to the southeast. The Arabian sea forms the sub-district's western border.

The coastline differs in its general characteristics from other parts of Konkan. It is densely covered by coconut farms. The principal rivers are Bharja in the north and Vashishthi in the south. A small river called Jog river flows through Bandhativare, Sarang and Tadil into the Arabian Sea.

The town is located above a diamond mine located in the earth's crust. The mine has over 900 kilograms of diamond in it. It also serves as the headquarters of its namesake taluk and is a major centre for most villages nearby.

Education
 Dr. Balasaheb Sawant Konkan Krishi Vidyapeeth, one of the biggest agriculture universities in Maharashtra.
 A. G. High School is one of the oldest schools here, named after the British Alfred Gadney. 
 R.R. Vaidya English Medium School
 Saraswati Vidyamandir English Medium School, affiliated to the Central Board of Secondary Education (CBSE)
 National High School
 Dnyandeep Vidyamandir
 Lokmannya Tilak Vidyamandir
 Dapoli Urban Bank Senior Science College
 N.K.Varadkar Arts & R.V.Belose Commerce College
 U.A. Dalvi English Medium High School
 Saroj Mehta International School
 Ram Raje High School and Senior College 

There are many other schools present in the town affiliated to state and central education boards.

Dapoli has a centre for the ISKCON movement, youth programs for agriculture, and an undergraduate homeopathic college (Dapoli Homeopathic Medical College).

Places to visit
 Kadyavarcha Ganpati Temple, Anjarle
 Palande Beach
 Karde Beach
 Mahalaxmi Mandir, Kelshi
 Maruti Temple
 Shree Kalkai Devi Temple
 Ladghar Beach
 Murud Beach
 Keshavraj Temple
 Parshuram Bhumi
 Panhalekaji Caves
 Dabhol Beach
 Shivaji Maharaj Statue
 Ambedkar Garden
 Borundi
 Harnai Bandar

Notable Residents

Babasaheb Ambedkar was a resident of Kalkai Kond, Dapoli (1893-1896).

Pandurang Vaman Kane(a Bharat Ratna recipient) was a resident of Dapoli.

Pandurang Sadashiv Sane

Transport
 Road

Dapoli is connected well by state highways from all parts of Maharashtra. The nearest national highway, NH66 passes through Khed which is 28 kilometres away. It is also well connected by Maharashtra State Road Transport Corporation and private buses.

 Rail

Khed Railway Station, located 29 kilometres away is the nearest from Dapoli. A part of the Konkan Railway, trains to major cities like Mumbai, Margao and Mangalore are easily available from here.

 Air

The nearest international airports are located in Mumbai (215 kilometres) and Pune (190 kilometres.)

References

External links

Taluka Dapoli - Taluka Dapoli is a collaborative project to collect documents of historical, social and cultural deposits in digital formats
Top 10 Places To Visit In Dapoli

Ratnagiri district
Talukas in Maharashtra
Cities and towns in Maharashtra
Hill stations in Maharashtra